The 1932–33 Texas Longhorns men's basketball team represented The University of Texas at Austin in intercollegiate basketball competition during the 1932–33 season. The Longhorns were led by second-year head coach Ed Olle and captained by future Longhorn football head coach Ed Price. The team finished the season with a 22–1 record and was retroactively named the national champion by the Premo-Porretta Power Poll.

Schedule and results

References 

Texas Longhorns men's basketball seasons
Texas
NCAA Division I men's basketball tournament championship seasons
Texas Longhorns Basketball Team
Texas Longhorns Basketball Team